Safi is a name of Arabic origin meaning "pure." It is a common surname in Levantine countries such as Palestine, Syria and Lebanon. It is also employed by Afghans as a "last name" to refer to their tribal lineage within the Safi tribe, a sub-tribe based in north-eastern Afghanistan.

Notable people with the name include:
Safi Asfia (1916–2008), Iranian technocrat and politician

Notes

Arabic masculine given names